Peter Hrivňák (born 6 May 1965) is a Slovak boxer. He competed at the 1988 Summer Olympics and the 1992 Summer Olympics.

References

1965 births
Living people
Slovak male boxers
Czechoslovak male boxers
Olympic boxers of Czechoslovakia
Boxers at the 1988 Summer Olympics
Boxers at the 1992 Summer Olympics
Sportspeople from Košice
Super-heavyweight boxers